Carlton Barmore Hutchins (September 12, 1904 – February 2, 1938) was a U.S. Naval aviator who lost his life in a mid-air collision in 1938.  Mortally injured, he was able to remain at the controls and allow his surviving crew to parachute to safety.   He was posthumously awarded the Medal of Honor.

Biography
Hutchins was born in Albany, New York, September 12, 1904, and graduated from the United States Naval Academy in 1926, the same class as Lofton Henderson, Max Leslie, and Wade McClusky. After serving on battleship  until 1928, he underwent flight training at the Naval Aeronautical Station in Pensacola, Florida and was designated a naval aviator in February 1929.

In 1937, he served with a seaplane squadron in the Caribbean and in November was transferred to Patrol Squadron 11 based on the tender . During fleet exercises, on February 2, 1938, off the coast of southern California, Lieutenant Hutchins' seaplane collided in mid-air with another PBY.  Lieutenant Hutchins lost his life in the crash and received the Medal of Honor posthumously.

Namesake
In 1942, the destroyer  was named in his honor.

Medal of Honor citation
His citation for the Medal of Honor reads:

Although his plane was badly damaged, Lieutenant Hutchins remained at the controls endeavoring to bring the damaged plane to a safe landing and to afford an opportunity for his crew to escape by parachutes. His cool, calculated conduct contributed principally to the saving of the lives of all who survived. His conduct on this occasion was above and beyond the call of duty.

See also

List of Medal of Honor recipients
List of Medal of Honor recipients in non-combat incidents

References

1904 births
1938 deaths
United States Naval Aviators
United States Navy Medal of Honor recipients
United States Navy officers
United States Naval Academy alumni
Non-combat recipients of the Medal of Honor